Mwana is an African name.

Notable people with the name include:

People
Mwana Kupona (died c.1865), Swahili poet 
Pierre Mwana Kasongo (born 1938), Congolese football player

Mythology
Mbaba Mwana Waresa, fertility goddess of the Zulu religion of Southern Africa